Marit Henie Moe (13 February 1925 – 4 November 2012) was a Norwegian figure skater who competed in single skating and pair skating. She was a cousin of figure skater Sonja Henie. She competed for the club Oslo SK in the early 1930s, but later for Oslo IL during the heyday of her career. Her skating partner was Erling Bjerkhoel

She competed at the 1947 World Figure Skating Championships, where she placed 11th in pairs, with partner Erling Bjerkhoel. She also participated at the 1948 Winter Olympics. Henie also won the Norwegian Figure Skating Championships in 1946, 1947 1948, 1949, 1950 and 1951, and won the King's Cup in 1946 and 1947.

Results

Ladies singles

Pairs
(with Bjerkhoel)

References

External links
 

1925 births
2012 deaths
Sportspeople from Oslo
Norwegian female single skaters
Norwegian female pair skaters
Figure skaters at the 1948 Winter Olympics
Olympic figure skaters of Norway
20th-century Norwegian women